George Thomas Atkinson (3 September 1893 – 29 May 1967) was an English footballer who represented Great Britain as a center half at the 1920 Summer Olympics. He also played for Bishop Auckland throughout his career.

References

1893 births
1967 deaths
English footballers
Bishop Auckland F.C. players
Olympic footballers of Great Britain
Footballers at the 1920 Summer Olympics
Association football midfielders